is a Japanese voice actress from Chiba Prefecture who is affiliated with Pro-Fit. She made her voice acting debut in 2014 while still in training school. She is known for her roles as Oguri Cap in Uma Musume Pretty Derby, Mikan Hinatsuki in The Demon Girl Next Door, and Mira Konohata in Asteroid in Love.

Biography
Takayanagi was born in Chiba Prefecture on October 14, 1994. As a child, she was interested in dancing and listening to the radio. She first became interested in voice acting after hearing Sayaka Ohara on a program on the radio station Bay FM. At the time, she thought that Ohara was merely a radio host and did not learn that she was a voice actress until later.

Upon entering junior high school, Takayanagi gained an interest in anime, which was furthered upon learning that Ohara played roles in series such as Honey and Clover, Code Geass, and XxxHolic. Her interest was also strengthened by her frequent use of the website Niconico, which was gaining popularity at the time. By the end of her first year in junior high school, she had decided to pursue a career in voice acting.

Although Takayanagi wished to pursue a voice acting career early on, she instead decided to focus on her studies due to the lack of a drama club in her school. During her first year of college, she enrolled in a training school operated by the talent agency Pro-Fit. While undergoing training, she played her first roles in the anime series In Search of the Lost Future and Nobunaga Concerto. In 2015, she formally joined Pro-Fit as a talent.

In 2017, Takayanagi played the role of Rino Fujisaki in Hina Logi: From Luck & Logic. The following year, she played the roles of Oguri Cap in Uma Musume Pretty Derby and An Hatoma in Island. In 2019, she played the roles of  Mikan Hinatsuki in The Demon Girl Next Door and Akari Haeno in Re:Stage!. In 2020, she was cast as Mira Konohata, the protagonist of the anime series Asteroid in Love.

Filmography

Anime
2014
In Search of the Lost Future as Female student (episode 12)
Nobunaga Concerto as Child (episode 1)

2015
Shounen Hollywood as Fan (episode 16)
Teekyu as Store clerk (Episode 49), Female student (Episode 51)
Dance with Devils as Answering machine (Episode 3)

2017
Sakurada Reset as Store clerk (episode 11)
Hina Logi: From Luck & Logic as Rino Fujisaki
Dynamic Chord as Audience

2018
Citrus as student A (Episode 2)
Uma Musume Pretty Derby as Oguri Cap
Aikatsu Friends! as Nonoha Nonomura
Island as An Hatoma, Ann Hartman

2019
Circlet Princess as Union senior
Wataten!: An Angel Flew Down to Me as Classmate
The Demon Girl Next Door as Mikan Hinatsuki
Re:Stage! as Akari Haeno

2020
Asteroid in Love as Mira Konohata

2021
Those Snow White Notes as Keiko Koyabu
Osamake as Rena Asagi

2022
My Dress-Up Darling as Wakana Gojō (young) 
The Demon Girl Next Door Season 2 as Mikan Hinatsuki
Shine Post as Nanoka Hiumi

2023
Oshi no Ko as Sarina
I Shall Survive Using Potions! as Francette

Video games
2020
Magia Record as Hagumu Azumi
2021
Blue Reflection: Second Light as Kokoro Utsubo
2023
Octopath Traveler II as Pala
Fire Emblem Engage as Lapis

References

External links
Official agency profile 

1994 births
Living people
Japanese video game actresses
Japanese voice actresses
Voice actresses from Chiba Prefecture